Sargis Adamyan (born 23 May 1993) is an Armenian footballer who plays for Bundesliga club 1. FC Köln and the Armenia national team.

Early life
Born in Yerevan, Armenia, Adamyan moved to Germany at age five. He spent some of his youth years at Hansa Rostock.

Career
In the 2016–17 season, Adamyan scored 16 goals and made 5 assists in 33 Regionalliga Südwest matches for TSV Steinbach.

On 5 June 2017, he signed a two-year contract with 2. Bundesliga side SSV Jahn Regensburg.

Adamyan signed a three-year contract with Bundesliga club TSG 1899 Hoffenheim on 14 May 2019.

In January 2022 he was loaned to Belgian side Club Brugge to the end of the 2021–22 season, with an option to buy.

After the end of his loan at Brugge, Adamyan transferred to 1. FC Köln, where he signed a contract until 2026.

Personal life
In August 2021, Adamyan married German model Anna Wilken, who is known from Germany's Next Topmodel.

Career statistics

Club

International

International goals
Scores and results list Armenia's goal tally first.

References

External links
 

1993 births
Living people
Armenian footballers
Armenia international footballers
Armenian emigrants to Germany
FC Hansa Rostock players
TSG Neustrelitz players
1. FC Neubrandenburg 04 players
TSV Steinbach Haiger players
SSV Jahn Regensburg players
TSG 1899 Hoffenheim players
TSG 1899 Hoffenheim II players
Club Brugge KV players
Bundesliga players
2. Bundesliga players
3. Liga players
Regionalliga players
Belgian Pro League players
Armenian expatriate footballers
Expatriate footballers in Germany
Armenian expatriate sportspeople in Germany
Expatriate footballers in Belgium
Armenian expatriate sportspeople in Belgium
Association football forwards
1. FC Köln players